Luiz, o Visitante is the stage name of Luiz Paulo Pereira da Silva (born July 22, 1995), a Brazilian singer, songwriter, producer and designer. The rapper has recorded one album, became known for his songs "Recomeço" and "Rolé a Noite".

History
Born and raised in Pernambuco, in Recife, began making his first compositions at age 13, but has started his career as a singer in 2009. it became producer for self-produce it, and the time has come professionalizing his musical work. In 2012, Luiz, o Visitante releases his first single, titled "Recomeço", which would mean a new phase of his career with the hit, he was recognized by Brazil, considered one of the leading names in the Rap Pernambuco. in the same year, released their second single with the title of "Rolé a Noite" with special guest singer miner, "Máximos". In 2013 released his debut album, also titled "Recomeço", his first single led to the album title.

Discography 
 2013: 
 2014:

Singles
 2012: ""
 2012: " (feat. Máximos)"
 2010: " (feat. Big Ralf)"
 2013: " (feat. Big Ralf)"

References

Brazilian rappers
Brazilian composers
Living people
1995 births
People from Pernambuco